William Spehr Koop (21 March 1906 – 14 April 1950) was an Australian rules footballer who played for Carlton in the Victorian Football League (VFL) during the 1920s.

Koop did not make much of an impact at Carlton in his first three seasons and left Carlton in 1927 to coach Culcairn Football Club, NSW, before returning to Carlton in 1928. Koop played in two VFL Reserves premierships with Carlton in 1926 and 1928.

Koop then had a successful career in the Victorian Football Association as a key position defender, he was a centre half-back in Northcote's 1929 premiership team. He was appointed as captain / coach of Prahran in January, 1931, but had to resign in March, 1931 at the request of the Police Commissioner. Koop then enjoyed some individual success at Prahran, winning the 1931 Recorder Cup. Koop was also a premiership player with Prahran in 1937.

The 146 game Prahran veteran was named, in 2003, on the interchange bench in their official 'Team of the Century'.

References

Holmesby, Russell and Main, Jim (2007). The Encyclopedia of AFL Footballers. 7th ed. Melbourne: Bas Publishing.
1927 - Culcairn. The Corowa Free Press (NSW). 9 April 1927.

External links

Bill Koop's Profile at Blueseum

1906 births
Australian rules footballers from Victoria (Australia)
Carlton Football Club players
Northcote Football Club players
Prahran Football Club players
Dimboola Football Club players
1950 deaths